Tyler Toner is an American former professional mixed martial arts fighter. A professional from 2005 until 2014, he fought in the UFC, WEC, Strikeforce, and the RFA.

Background
Born and raised in Colorado, Toner began training in Taekwondo at age five, and at age eight was the national point-sparring champion. In high school, Toner played football and trained in boxing and kickboxing.

Mixed martial arts career

WEC
Toner was scheduled to make his World Extreme Cagefighting debut against Brandon Visher on December 19, 2009 at WEC 45. However, Toner was denied a license from the Nevada State Athletic Commission, because his vision was too poor to fight.

Toner instead faced Visher on April 24, 2010 at WEC 48.  He won the fight via TKO (elbows) in the first round.

Toner faced Diego Nunes on September 30, 2010 at WEC 51.  He lost the fight via unanimous decision.

Ultimate Fighting Championship
In October 2010, World Extreme Cagefighting merged with the Ultimate Fighting Championship. As part of the merger, all WEC fighters were transferred to the UFC.

Toner was expected to face Leonard Garcia on December 4, 2010 at The Ultimate Finale 12, but after Garcia was rescheduled to fight Nam Phan, Ian Loveland stepped in to face Toner. Toner lost the fight via unanimous decision (30-27, 30-26, 29-28).

After the loss, he was subsequently released from the promotion.

Shootboxing
On June 1, 2009, Toner traveled to Japan on short notice to take on Shootboxing World Champion Kenichi Ogata. Widely considered a big underdog, Toner shocked the Japanese audience by knocking out Ogata with a head kick at 2:58 of the first round securing the upset win over the former champion.

Personal life
Toner and his wife were married six weeks after his fight at WEC 48.

Kickboxing Record

|-
|Win
|align=center|1–0
| Kenichi Ogata
|KO (high kick)
|Shoot Boxing 2009 Bushido 3rd
|
|align=center|1
|align=center|2:58
|Bunkyo, Tokyo, Japan
|

Mixed martial arts record

|-
|Loss
|align=center|15–7 (1)
| Daniel Aguiar
| Submission (heel hook)
| RFA 14: Manzanares vs. Maranhao
|
|align=center| 1
|align=center| 0:29
|Cheyenne, Wyoming, United States
|
|-
|Win
|align=center|15–6 (1)
| Gilbert Jimenez
|Decision (unanimous)
| Fight to Win: Paramount Prize Fighting 2014
|
|align=center| 3
|align=center| 5:00
|Denver, Colorado, United States
|
|-
|Loss
|align=center|14–6 (1)
| Raoni Barcelos
|Decision (unanimous) 
| RFA 11: Manzanares vs. Makovsky
|
|align=center| 3
|align=center| 5:00
|Broomfield, Colorado, United States
|
|-
|Win
|align=center|14–5 (1)
| Cody Carrillo
|TKO (punches)
| ROF: Buckley MMA Fight Night
|
|align=center|2
|align=center|2:58
| Aurora, Colorado, United States
|
|-
|Loss
|align=center|13–5 (1)
|John Fraser
|Decision (unanimous)
| SFS 6: Score Fighting Series 6
|
|align=center|3
|align=center|5:00
|Sarnia, Ontario, Canada
|
|-
|Loss
|align=center|13–4 (1)
|Cameron Dollar
|Submission (rear-naked choke)
| ROF 43: Bad Blood
|
|align=center|2
|align=center|2:00
|Broomfield, Colorado, United States
|For the vacant ROF Featherweight Championship.
|-
|Win
|align=center|13–3 (1)
|Nick Macias
|Decision (unanimous)
|ROF 42: Who's Next
|
|align=center|3
|align=center|5:00
|Broomfield, Colorado, United States
|
|-
|Win
|align=center|12–3 (1)
|Gilbert Sims
|TKO (punches)
|ROF 41: Bragging Rights
|
|align=center|3
|align=center|3:49
|Broomfield, Colorado, United States
|Catchweight (147 lb) bout.
|-
|Loss
|align=center|11–3 (1)
|Ian Loveland
|Decision (unanimous)
|The Ultimate Fighter 12 Finale
|
|align=center|3
|align=center|5:00
|Las Vegas, Nevada, United States
|
|-
|Loss
|align=center|11–2 (1)
|Diego Nunes
|Decision (unanimous)
|WEC 51
|
|align=center|3
|align=center|5:00
|Broomfield, Colorado, United States
|
|-
|Win
|align=center|11–1 (1)
|Brandon Visher
|TKO (elbows)
|WEC 48
|
|align=center|1
|align=center|2:36
|Sacramento, California, United States
|
|-
|Win
|align=center|10–1 (1)
|Fabio Serrão
|Decision (unanimous)
|ROF 35: Summer Brawl
|
|align=center|3
|align=center|5:00
|Broomfield, Colorado, United States
|
|-
|Win
|align=center|9–1 (1)
|D.J. Fuentes
|TKO (punches)  
|ROF 34: Judgment Day
|
|align=center|1
|align=center|3:35 
|Broomfield, Colorado, United States
|
|-
| NC
|align=center|8–1 (1) 
|Jamie Schmidt
|No Contest 
|ROF 33: Adrenaline
|
|align=center|2
|align=center|0:27
|Broomfield, Colorado, United States
|
|-
|Win
|align=center|8–1
|Ricky Johnson
|TKO (punches)
|Strikeforce: Payback 
|
|align=center|2
|align=center|3:44
|Broomfield, Colorado, United States
|
|-
|Win
|align=center|7–1
|Brett Roller
|Submission (triangle choke)
|Battlequest 7: RESURRECTION
|
|align=center|1
|align=center|0:55
|Denver, Colorado, United States
|
|-
|Win
|align=center|6–1
|Nick Mamalis
|Submission (armbar)
|Battlequest 6: SHOOTOUT
|
|align=center|1
|align=center|4:23
|Eagle, Colorado, United States
|
|-
|Loss
|align=center|5–1
|Scott Jorgensen
|Decision (unanimous) 
|ROF 29: Aftershock
|
|align=center|3
|align=center|5:00 
|Broomfield, Colorado, United States
|
|-
|Win
|align=center|5–0
|Joe Jesser
|Decision (split)
|ROF 27: Collision Course
|
|align=center|3
|align=center|5:00
|Denver, Colorado, United States
|
|-
|Win
|align=center|4–0
|Mike Aragon
|TKO (strikes)
|ROF 24: Integrity
|
|align=center|1
|align=center|N/A
|Castle Rock, Colorado, United States
|
|-
|Win
|align=center|3–0
|Gerald Lovato
|KO (punch)
|ROF 23: Impact
|
|align=center|1
|align=center|0:22
|Colorado, United States
|
|-
|Win
|align=center|2–0
|Pete Ozuk
|Submission (triangle choke)
|ROF 20: Elite
|
|align=center|1
|align=center|1:00
|Castle Rock, Colorado, United States
|
|-
|Win
|align=center|1–0
|Josh Alloway
|TKO (punches)
|Ring of Fire 18: River Valley Rumble 
|
|align=center|1
|align=center|N/A
|North Platte, Nebraska, United States
|
|-

References

External links 

Year of birth missing (living people)
Living people
American male mixed martial artists
Mixed martial artists utilizing taekwondo
Mixed martial artists utilizing boxing
Mixed martial artists utilizing shootboxing
American male kickboxers
American male taekwondo practitioners